United Nations Security Council resolution 914, adopted unanimously on 27 April 1994, after recalling resolutions 908 (1994) and 913 (1994), the council, acting under Chapter VII of the United Nations Charter, increased the strength of the United Nations Protection Force (UNPROFOR) by up to 6,550 additional troops, 150 military observers and 275 civilian police monitors.

See also
 Bosnian War
 Breakup of Yugoslavia
 Croatian War of Independence
 List of United Nations Security Council Resolutions 901 to 1000 (1994–1995)
 Yugoslav Wars

References

External links
 
Text of the Resolution at undocs.org

 0914
 0914
1994 in Yugoslavia
1994 in Bosnia and Herzegovina
1994 in Croatia
 0914
 0914
 0914
April 1994 events